The Calaveras County Courthouse is a historic courthouse building in San Andreas, California. The brick courthouse was built in 1867 and contained the county's courtroom, jail, and sheriff's office; until 1888, executions were also conducted in the building. The county's Hall of Records was built in front of the courthouse in 1893; the two buildings nearly touch and are considered part of the same complex. The building's jail held outlaw Black Bart, a notorious Northern California highwayman, during his 1883 trial. In 1966, the county moved its courthouse to a new building; the old courthouse is now the Calaveras County Museum, which is operated by the Calaveras County Historical Society.

The Calaveras County Courthouse was added to the National Register of Historic Places on February 28, 1972.

References

External links
 Calaveras County Historical Society

Courthouses on the National Register of Historic Places in California
Government buildings completed in 1867
Buildings and structures in Calaveras County, California
County courthouses in California
Museums in Calaveras County, California
History museums in California
1867 establishments in California
National Register of Historic Places in Calaveras County, California